Suicide Squad is a 1935 American action film directed by Raymond K. Johnson and starring Norman Foster, Joyce Compton and Robert Homans.

It was made as a second feature by the independent outfit Puritan Pictures. The film's sets were designed by the art director Vin Taylor.

Synopsis
A young firefighter's exploits gain him newspaper attention, but the publicity starts to go to his head.

Cast
 Norman Foster as Larry Parker
 Joyce Compton as Mary O'Connor
 Robert Homans as Capt. Tim O'Connor
 Aggie Herring as Mother O'Connor
 Peter Warren as Mickey O'Connor
 Jack Luden as Ed Drake
 Phil Kramer as Snaps - Photographer

References

Bibliography
 Pitts, Michael R. Poverty Row Studios, 1929-1940. McFarland & Company, 2005.

External links
 

1935 films
1930s action films
American action films
Films directed by Raymond K. Johnson
1930s English-language films
1930s American films